Gabriel Ebert is an American stage actor and singer.

Early life
Ebert was born and raised in Colorado. He attended high school at the Denver School of the Arts and graduated from Juilliard.

Career
Ebert made his Broadway debut as the understudy for the role of Ken in John Logan's play Red in 2010, followed by the Broadway production of Kneehigh Theatre's Brief Encounter in 2010 as Stanley.

Ebert is known for originating the role of Mr. Wormwood in the Broadway 2013 production of Matilda the Musical, for which he won the 2013 Tony Award for Best Featured Actor in a Musical. Ebert's performance in Amy Herzog's 4000 Miles at Lincoln Center Theater as the character "Leo", the grandson of Mary Louise Wilson's Vera, won him an Obie Award in 2012.

He starred as Robin Hood in The Heart of Robin Hood by David Farr in Winnipeg and Toronto in October 2014 to March 2015.

He played the role of Max in the 2015 movie Ricki and the Flash. In the 2015 production of the Helen Edmundson stage adaption of Thérèse Raquin at the Roundabout Theater at Studio 54 he played Camille opposite Keira Knightley, Judith Light, and Matt Ryan.

In 2016, Ebert was cast in the pilot for the Amazon Video television program The Interestings.

Work

Film and television

Theatre (selected)

References

External links
 
 

American male musical theatre actors
Living people
Place of birth missing (living people)
Tony Award winners
American male singers
Juilliard School alumni
1988 births